Waldo Sponton (born November 4, 1974) is an Argentinian former footballer.

Playing career 
Sponton began his career in the Argentine Primera División in 1994 with Club Atlético Platense, where he appeared in 16 matches and scored one goal. In 1997, he signed with Asociación Deportiva Berazategui, and in 1999 he went to Peru to sign with Deportivo Municipal. In 2000, he played abroad in the United States with amateur side Uruguay Soccer Club. Sponton returned to the professional level in 2001 by signing with the Toronto Lynx in the USL A-League. He made 24 appearances and recorded two goals for Toronto.

In 2002, he played in the Canadian Professional Soccer League with Toronto Supra. In 2007, he played in the Ontario Soccer League with A.C. Soccer Diavoli where he was named the MVP in the South Region West division.

References 

Argentine footballers
Argentine Primera División players
Deportivo Municipal footballers
Club Atlético Platense footballers
SC Toronto players
Toronto Lynx players
Canadian Soccer League (1998–present) players
A-League (1995–2004) players
Association football forwards
1974 births
Living people
Footballers from Santa Fe, Argentina